The 56th New York State Legislature, consisting of the New York State Senate and the New York State Assembly, met from January 1 to April 30, 1833, during the first year of William L. Marcy's governorship, in Albany.

Background
Under the provisions of the New York Constitution of 1821, 32 Senators were elected on general tickets in eight senatorial districts for four-year terms. They were divided into four classes, and every year eight Senate seats came up for election. Assemblymen were elected countywide on general tickets to a one-year term, the whole Assembly being renewed annually.

At this time, there were three political parties: the Jacksonian Democrats, the Anti-Masonic Party, and the National Republican Party.

The Anti-Masonic state convention met on June 21, and nominated again Assemblyman Francis Granger for governor and Samuel Stevens, of New York City, for lieutenant governor. They also nominated a full ticket of presidential electors, apparently composed of some supporters of William Wirt, and  some of Henry Clay, but not pledged to any candidate.

The National Republican state convention met on July 26, Ambrose Spencer was chairman. They endorsed The Anti-Masonic nominees Granger and Stevens. They also endorsed the ticket of presidential electors nominated by the Anti-Masons, who—if they won the election—should vote for Henry Clay if this would help to defeat Jackson, otherwise for Wirt. In effect, both parties were in the process of merging, forming an Anti-Jacksonian bloc which eventually became the Whig Party.

The Jacksonian state convention met on September 19 at Herkimer, Samuel Young was chairman. They nominated U.S. Senator William L. Marcy for governor, and Judge John Tracy for lieutenant governor.

Elections
The state election was held from November 5 to 7, 1832. William L. Marcy and John Tracy were elected governor and lieutenant governor; and the Andrew Jackson/Martin Van Buren electoral ticket won.

State Senator John F. Hubbard (6th D.) was re-elected. John Sudam (2nd D.), Peter Gansevoort (3rd D.), Louis Hasbrouck (4th D.), John G. Stower (5th D.), Samuel L. Edwards (7th D.), John Griffin (8th D.) and Assemblyman Myndert Van Schaick (1st D.) were also elected to the Senate. Griffin and Hasbrouck were Anti-Jacksonians, the other six were Jacksonians.

Sessions
The Legislature met for the regular session at the Old State Capitol in Albany on January 1, 1833; and adjourned on April 30.

Charles L. Livingston (D) was re-elected Speaker with 99 votes against 22 for John C. Spencer (A-M).

On January 4, the Legislature elected State Comptroller Silas Wright, Jr. to the U.S. Senate, to fill the vacancy caused by the resignation of Gov. Marcy. Wright resigned the office of Comptroller on January 7.

On January 11, the Legislature elected Secretary of State Azariah C. Flagg to succeed Wright as State Comptroller. Flagg resigned the office of Secretary of State on January 12.

On January 15, the Legislature elected Adjutant General John Adams Dix to succeed Flagg as Secretary of State.

On February 4, the Legislature re-elected State Treasurer Abraham Keyser, Jr.

On February 5, the Legislature elected State Senator Nathaniel P. Tallmadge to succeed Charles E. Dudley as U.S. Senator for a six-year term beginning on March 4, 1833.

On February 21, the Legislature passed "An act for the construction of the Chenango Canal".

On March 23, the Legislature passed "An act authorising the appointment of an additional Canal Commissioner", and on April 4, the Legislature elected Michael Hoffman as such.

State Senate

Districts
 The First District (4 seats) consisted of Kings, New York, Queens, Richmond and Suffolk counties.
 The Second District (4 seats) consisted of Delaware, Dutchess, Orange, Putnam, Rockland, Sullivan, Ulster and Westchester counties.
 The Third District (4 seats) consisted of Albany, Columbia, Greene, Rensselaer, Schenectady and Schoharie counties.
 The Fourth District (4 seats) consisted of Clinton, Essex, Franklin, Hamilton, Montgomery, St. Lawrence, Saratoga, Warren and Washington counties.
 The Fifth District (4 seats) consisted of Herkimer, Jefferson, Lewis, Madison, Oneida and Oswego counties.
 The Sixth District (4 seats) consisted of Broome, Chenango, Cortland, Otsego, Steuben, Tioga and Tompkins counties.
 The Seventh District (4 seats) consisted of Cayuga, Onondaga, Ontario, Seneca, Wayne and Yates counties.
 The Eighth District (4 seats) consisted of Allegany, Cattaraugus, Chautauqua, Erie, Genesee, Livingston, Monroe, Niagara and Orleans counties.

Note: There are now 62 counties in the State of New York. The counties which are not mentioned in this list had not yet been established, or sufficiently organized, the area being included in one or more of the abovementioned counties.

Members
The asterisk (*) denotes members of the previous Legislature who continued in office as members of this Legislature. Myndert Van Schaick changed from the Assembly to the Senate.

Employees
 Clerk: John F. Bacon

State Assembly

Districts

 Albany County (3 seats)
 Allegany County (1 seat)
 Broome County (1 seat)
 Cattaraugus County (1 seat)
 Cayuga County (4 seats)
 Chautauqua County (2 seats)
 Chenango County (3 seats)
 Clinton County (1 seat)
 Columbia County (3 seats)
 Cortland County (2 seats)
 Delaware County (2 seats)
 Dutchess County (4 seats)
 Erie County (2 seats)
 Essex County (1 seat)
 Franklin County (1 seat)
 Genesee County (3 seats)
 Greene County (2 seats)
 Hamilton and Montgomery counties (3 seats)
 Herkimer County (3 seats)
 Jefferson County (3 seats)
 Kings County (1 seat)
 Lewis County (1 seat)
 Livingston County (2 seats)
 Madison County (3 seats)
 Monroe County (3 seats)
 The City and County of New York (11 seats)
 Niagara County (1 seat)
 Oneida County (5 seats)
 Onondaga County (4 seats)
 Ontario County (3 seats)
 Orange County (3 seats)
 Orleans County (1 seat)
 Oswego County (1 seat)
 Otsego County (4 seats)
 Putnam County (1 seat)
 Queens County (1 seat)
 Rensselaer County (4 seats)
 Richmond County (1 seat)
 Rockland County (1 seat)
 St. Lawrence County (2 seats)
 Saratoga County (3 seats)
 Schenectady County (1 seat)
 Schoharie County (2 seats)
 Seneca County (2 seats)
 Steuben County (2 seats)
 Suffolk County (2 seats)
 Sullivan County (1 seat)
 Tioga County (2 seats)
 Tompkins County (3 seats)
 Ulster County (2 seats)
 Warren County (1 seat)
 Washington (3 seats)
 Wayne County (2 seats)
 Westchester County (3 seats)
 Yates County (1 seat)

Note: There are now 62 counties in the State of New York. The counties which are not mentioned in this list had not yet been established, or sufficiently organized, the area being included in one or more of the abovementioned counties.

Assemblymen
The asterisk (*) denotes members of the previous Legislature who continued as members of this Legislature.

The party affiliations follow the vote on U.S. senators and other State officers on January 4, 11 and 15; February 4 and 5; and April 4.

Employees
 Clerk: Francis Seger
 Sergeant-at-Arms: Cornelius A. Waldron
 Doorkeeper: Alonzo Crosby
 Assistant Doorkeeper: James Courter

Notes

Sources
 The New York Civil List compiled by Franklin Benjamin Hough (Weed, Parsons and Co., 1858) [pg. 109 and 441 for Senate districts; pg. 129 for senators; pg. 148f for Assembly districts; pg. 213f for assemblymen]
 The History of Political Parties in the State of New-York, from the Ratification of the Federal Constitution to 1840 by Jabez D. Hammond (4th ed., Vol. 2, Phinney & Co., Buffalo, 1850; pg. 424 to 435)

056
1833 in New York (state)
1833 U.S. legislative sessions